Mobile City Hospital, also known as Old Mobile General Hospital, is a historic Greek Revival hospital building in Mobile, Alabama, United States.  It was built in 1830 by Thomas S. James and served as a hospital for the city of Mobile from 1831 until 1966.  It was administered for the city by the Sisters of Charity throughout a large part of its history.  Residents of the city were treated here during epidemics of yellow fever and during the American Civil War.  It was converted to office space after 1966. It was added to the National Register of Historic Places on February 26, 1970. The building is adjacent to the old U.S. Marine Hospital, which is also on the National Register.

Description
The building is stuccoed brick,  with two stories over a raised basement. It features a long colonnaded front facade with a central projecting hexastyle portico supported by full-height Doric columns carrying a full entablature and parapet across the front of the building.  The rooms open onto two levels of galleries behind the colonnade.

References

National Register of Historic Places in Mobile, Alabama
Buildings and structures in Mobile, Alabama
Greek Revival architecture in Alabama
Hospital buildings completed in 1830
American Civil War hospitals
Defunct hospitals in Alabama
1830 establishments in Alabama